Brent London Borough Council is the local authority for the London Borough of Brent in Greater London, England. It is a London borough council, one of 32 in the United Kingdom capital of London. It is based at Brent Civic Centre in Engineers Way, Wembley.

History

There have previously been a number of local authorities responsible for the Brent area. The current local authority was first elected in 1964, a year before formally coming into its powers and prior to the creation of the London Borough of Brent on 1 April 1965. Brent replaced the Municipal Borough of Wembley and the Municipal Borough of Willesden.

It was envisaged that through the London Government Act 1963, Brent as a London local authority would share power with the Greater London Council. The split of powers and functions meant that the Greater London Council was responsible for "wide area" services such as fire, ambulance, flood prevention, and refuse disposal; with the local authorities responsible for "personal" services such as social care, libraries, cemeteries and refuse collection. As an outer London borough council it has been an education authority since 1965. This arrangement lasted until 1986 when Brent London Borough Council gained responsibility for some services that had been provided by the Greater London Council, such as waste disposal. Since 2000 the Greater London Authority has taken some responsibility for highways and planning control from the council, but within the English local government system the council remains a "most purpose" authority in terms of the available range of powers and functions.

On 27 February 2018, Brent was awarded the title of London Borough of Culture 2020, receiving £1.35m of funding under a new initiative launched by the Mayor of London Sadiq Khan. On Valentine's Day in 2016, the Council launched its ‘Love Where You Live’ campaign, an initiative which encouraged local people to work alongside the Council and make Brent a better, happier place to live. Groups such as Kensal Green Streets, Harlesden Environmental Action Residents, Northwest TWO and Keep Wembley Tidy all took action as a result of the campaign. In June 2016, a short, community-based documentary called ‘Stories of Brent’ was produced, based on the campaign, starring Audley Harrison, Rachel Yankey and Liz Mitchell from Boney M.

Powers and functions
The local authority derives its powers and functions from the London Government Act 1963 and subsequent legislation, and has the powers and functions of a London borough council. It sets council tax and as a billing authority also collects precepts for Greater London Authority functions and business rates. It sets planning policies which complement Greater London Authority and national policies, and decides on almost all planning applications accordingly. It is a local education authority and is also responsible for council housing, social services, libraries, waste collection and disposal, traffic, and most roads and environmental health.

Regeneration
In 2001, Brent launched its twenty-year Regeneration Strategy, which included participating in the redevelopment of Wembley Stadium. Considerable investment has been made in neighbourhood renewal programmes in the borough's most deprived neighbourhoods to improve social and economic conditions and work has now begun to transform the physical environment in South Kilburn.

Wembley is one of the largest regeneration projects in the country. According to the Mayor of London it can accommodate approximately 11,500 new homes and 10,000 new jobs through the development of sites along Wembley High Road and land around Wembley Stadium.

The Old Oak and Park Royal area is also proposed to undergo significant development. Under the Mayor of London's proposals, it will see the development of 25,500 new homes and 65,000 new jobs over the next 20–30 years. Old Oak and Park Royal will become a major transport hub where High Speed 2 meets Crossrail, creating super-fast links in and out of the area. The 640 plus hectare development site, which spans the three boroughs of Brent, Ealing and Hammersmith and Fulham, will be the largest regeneration site in London.

Political control

Since 1964 political control of the council has been held by the following parties:

Composition

See also
Brent Housing Partnership

References

External links
London Borough of Brent website

Local authorities in London
London borough councils
Politics of the London Borough of Brent
Leader and cabinet executives
Local education authorities in England
Billing authorities in England